Quli 
may refer to:
 Quli (Turkic), a word of Turkic origin meaning 'slave of', part of several Muslim male given names
 Quli (racial slur), a contemporary racial slur for people of Asian descent
 Quli, Guangxi, a town in Fusui County, Guangxi, China

See also
 Kuli (disambiguation)